Galzig is a mountain in the Lechtal Alps of Tyrol, Austria. Located near St. Anton am Arlberg, it is a popular hiking and skiing destination, depending on the season.

Mountains of the Alps
Mountains of Tyrol (state)
Lechtal Alps